Piratskattens hemlighet ("The Secret of the Pirate Treasure") is the Sveriges Television's Christmas calendar in 2014. It was recorded in Croatia between March–May 2014.

Plot 

The story is set in Croatia.

References

External links 
 
 

2014 Swedish television series debuts
2014 Swedish television series endings
Television series about pirates
Sveriges Television's Christmas calendar
Television shows set in Croatia